The Slovak Ore Mountains are an extensive mountain range within the Carpathian Mountains, located mostly in Slovakia's Spiš and Gemer region, with a small part in northern Hungary. It is the largest mountain range in Slovakia. Geomorphologically, the Slovak Ore Mountains belong to the Inner Western Carpathians.

The mountains are bordered by Zvolen in the west, Košice in the east, the rivers Hron and Hornád in the north, and the Juhoslovenská kotlina and Košice Basin (Košická kotlina) in the south. The region includes the Domica Cave (jaskyňa Domica), one of the largest caves in Europe, Zádiel canyon and Krásna Hôrka Castle.

Subdivision
Geomorphologically, the Slovak Ore Mountains are grouped within the Inner Western Carpathians. The mountains do not have a central ridge - they consist of several independent sections, geomorphological regions:
 Vepor Mountains (Veporské vrchy)
 Spiš-Gemer Karst (Spišsko-gemerský kras)
 Stolica Mountains (Stolické vrchy)
 Revúca Highlands (Revúcka vrchovina)
 Volovec Mountains (Volovské vrchy)
 Black Mountain (Čierna hora)
 Rožňava Basin (Rožňavská kotlina)
 Slovak Karst (Slovenský kras) and Aggtelek Karst (Hungarian: Aggteleki-karszt; lies in northern Hungary)

Characteristics
Basic data:
 highest peak:  Stolica, 1,476 m AMSL
 length: app. 140 km
 width: app. 40 km
 area: app. 4000 km2

Since this is a very extensive geomorphological unit, no general characterization is appropriate. The geomorphological structure is varied and has crystalline, Mesozoic and volcanic rocks.

Since time immemorial, especially in the early modern period, the mountains were, as the name suggests, heavily mined but are not any more.

Protected areas
Slovenské rudohorie contains the Muránska planina National Park, Slovak Karst National Park and Slovak Paradise National Park.

References 

Mountain ranges of Slovakia
Mountain ranges of the Western Carpathians
Spiš